A list of films produced in Hong Kong in 1956:.

1956

References

External links
 IMDB list of Hong Kong films
 Hong Kong films of 1956 at HKcinemamagic.com

1956
Lists of 1956 films by country or language
Films